Rackspace Technology, Inc. is an American cloud computing company based in Windcrest, Texas, an inner suburb of San Antonio, Texas. The company also has offices in Blacksburg, Virginia, and Austin, Texas, as well as in Australia, Canada, United Kingdom, India, Dubai, Switzerland, the Netherlands, Germany, Singapore, Mexico, and Hong Kong. Its data centers are located in Amsterdam (Netherlands), Virginia (USA), Chicago (USA), Dallas (USA), London (UK), Frankfurt (Germany), Hong Hong (China), Kansas City (USA), New York City (USA), San Jose (USA), Shanghai (China), Queenstown (Singapore), and Sydney (Australia).

History 

Although the founders began as application developers for end-users, they found that most companies did not either know how or want to host their applications. The founders wanted to focus on application development–not hosting–but they were unable to find an opportunity to outsource the hosting work. Eventually, the founders realized that it would be better to create a product to serve the hosting need and launch it as a company. Rackspace was launched in October 1998 with Richard Yoo as its CEO. Although most hosting companies focused on the technology end of hosting, Rackspace created its "Fanatical Support" offering to focus on service and support.  On March 28, 2000, Rackspace received funding through lead investor Norwest Venture Partners and Sequoia Capital. George J. Still, Jr., Managing Partner at Norwest,  subsequently joined the Board of Directors.

In 2008, Rackspace moved its headquarters from a building once occupied by Datapoint Corporation to the then-unoccupied Windsor Park Mall in Windcrest, Texas. Rackspace's Chairman, Graham Weston, owned the Montgomery Ward building in the mall until 2006 when it was sold to a developer. The facility is located next to Roosevelt High School, and many Roosevelt students intern at Rackspace.

Fortunes "Top 100 Best Companies to Work For 2008" placed Rackspace as  the first year that Rackspace applied for consideration.  The company was praised for its transparency. Regular "Open Book" meetings are held where the top level leaders share in-depth financial information with all employees. In 2011 and 2013, the company was named as one of the top 100 places to work by Fortune.

On August 8, 2008, Rackspace opened for trading on the New York Stock Exchange under the ticker symbol "RAX" after its initial public offering (IPO) in which it raised $187.5 million. The initial public offering included 15,000,000 shares of its common stock at a price of $12.50 per share. The IPO did not do well in the public market and lost about 20% of its initial price almost immediately.

At around 3:45 PM CST December 18, 2009, Rackspace experienced an outage for customers using their Dallas–Fort Worth data center – including those of Rackspace Cloud.

On September 8, 2010, Rackspace received national attention when they decided to discontinue providing web hosting service to one of their customers, Dove World Outreach Center.  This was in reaction to Dove World's pastor Terry Jones' plan to burn several copies of the Qur'an on the anniversary of the September 11th attacks. Rackspace claims that this violated their company policy.  This move came under criticism, notably from Terry Jones himself, who described it as an "indirect attack on our freedom of speech."  Others questioned the appropriateness of Rackspace's action, stating that there is "absolutely no reason for web hosts to have an editorial policy, and this only gives Jones more attention and makes him look more persecuted."

In August 2016, it was confirmed that Apollo Global Management had reached an agreement to buy the company for $4.3 billion. The sale was completed in November 2016 and Rackspace officially ended trading on the New York Stock Exchange on November 3, 2016.

In May 2017, CEO Taylor Rhodes announced he was leaving the company on May 16 to work for a smaller private company in a different city. In May 2017, Rackspace named Joe Eazor as its new CEO. 

In April 2019, the company named Kevin Jones as its new CEO.

In June 2020 it changed its name to Rackspace Technology.

In August 2020 Rackspace Technology opened for trading on the Nasdaq under the ticker symbol "RXT" after its initial public offering (IPO). The Initial public offering of 33,500,000 shares of its common stock at an initial public offering price of $21.00 per share.

In September 2022 the company named Amar Maletira as its new CEO.

In December 2022 Rackspace suffered a major service outage which affected all their hosted Exchange users (customers who bought email services from Rackspace that involved instances of Microsoft Exchange hosted on Rackspace's servers). After initial investigation Rackspace declared the incident a 'security incident' and said it had powered down its servers to protect customer data which some commentators speculated might be indicative of a ransomware incident, a theory that was lent further credence by Rackspace's decision to recommend that customers migrate to Microsoft365 rather than wait to have their Exchange-based solutions restored. On Monday 5 December 2022, the first full day of trading after the incident (which started on the previous Friday), Rackspace's shares were down as much as 16% ($0.75).

A class action lawsuit against Rackspace Technology, Inc. was filed on December 12, 2022, by Cole & Van Note for tens of thousands of businesses who lost access to their emails and services due to ransomware users. Stephenson, et al. v. Rackspace Technology, Inc.

Acquisitions 

On September 13, 2007, Rackspace announced it has acquired email hosting provider Webmail.us, based in Blacksburg, Virginia.

On October 22, 2008, Rackspace announced it was purchasing cloud storage provider Jungle Disk and VPS provider SliceHost.

On February 16, 2012, Rackspace acquired SharePoint911, a Microsoft SharePoint consulting company based in Cincinnati, Ohio.

On May 25, 2017, Rackspace announced an agreement to acquire TriCore Solutions.

On September 11, 2017, Rackspace announced plans to acquire Datapipe.

On September 17, 2018, Rackspace announced it had acquired RelationEdge.

On November 4, 2019, Rackspace announced plans to acquire Onica.

Other acquisitions include Cloudkick, Anso Labs, Mailgun, ObjectRocket, Exceptional Cloud Services, and ZeroVM.

On January 18, 2022, Rackspace announced it had acquired the Singapore-headquartered cloud-based data, analytics and AI company, Just Analytics.

Involvement with other companies 
Rackspace launched ServerBeach in San Antonio in January 2003 as a lower-cost alternative for dedicated servers designed for technology hobbyists who want flexibility and reliability. Richard Yoo was a catalyst in the startup of ServerBeach. A bandwidth and colocation provider, Peer 1 Hosting now known as Cogeco Peer 1, purchased ServerBeach in October 2004 for $7.5 Million. Peer 1 Hosting entered the UK managed hosting market in January 2009 and the ServerBeach brand now competes directly with the UK arm of Rackspace, run by Dominic Monkhouse, former managing director of Rackspace Limited.

In October 2006, Mosso Inc. was launched, which experimented with white-labeling hosting services. Eventually, the division became the foundation for the Rackspace Cloud Computing offering.

On October 1, 2007, Rackspace acquired Webmail.us, a private e-mail hosting firm located in Blacksburg, VA. Originally branded as Mailtrust on May 20, 2009, it became part of the newly formed Cloud Office division of Rackspace.

On October 22, 2008, Rackspace acquired Slicehost, a provider of virtual servers and Jungle Disk, a provider of online backup software and services.

Rackspace announced on March 8, 2017, plans for an expansion to its portfolio to include managed service for the Google Cloud Platform. The program began beta testing on July 18, 2017, with a planned full offering in late 2017. Rackspace partnered with Google in Customer Reliability Engineering, a group of Google Site Reliability Engineers, to ensure cloud applications "run with the same speed and reliability as some of Google's most widely-used products".

OpenStack 

In 2010, Rackspace contributed the source code of its Cloud Files product to the OpenStack project under the Apache License to become the OpenStack Object Storage component.

In April 2012, Rackspace announced it would implement OpenStack Compute as the underlying technology for their Cloud Servers product.  This change introduced a new control panel as well as add-on cloud services offering databases, server monitoring, block storage, and virtual networking. In 2015, two Rackspace executives were elected to the board of the OpenStack Foundation. In a February 2016 interview, CTO John Engates stated that Rackspace uses OpenStack to power their public and private cloud.

References 

1998 establishments in Texas
Internet technology companies of the United States
Cloud computing providers
Companies based in San Antonio
American companies established in 1998
Computer companies established in 1998
Companies formerly listed on the New York Stock Exchange
Web hosting
2008 initial public offerings
2016 mergers and acquisitions
Apollo Global Management companies
Companies listed on the Nasdaq
2020 initial public offerings